Alba Petisco de San Fulgencio (born 1 February 2003) is a Spanish artistic gymnast.  She represented Spain at the 2020 Olympic Games and the 2018 Youth Olympics where she was part of the Mixed NOC team who won gold in the mixed multi-discipline team competition.  Additionally she is the 2020 Spanish National Champion.

Early life 
Alba Petisco was born in Sant Joan Despí, Catalonia, Spain on 1 February 2003 but was raised in Villarino de los Aires.  She began training in gymnastics when she was 5 years old.  She trains at the Spanish gym Club Gimnástica Esplugues Les Moreres and the French club Gym Flip Beaucarie-Tarascon.

Gymnastics career

Junior

2016–17
Petisco made her international debut at the Elite Gym Massilia in November 2016.  She finished 53rd in the Open All-Around.  Later that month she competed at the Turnkunst International where she helped Spain finish fifth as a team and individually she finished 21st in the all-around.

In 2017 Petisco competed at the Top 12 Championships in France where her team finished in 8th place and individually Petisco finished 25th in the all-around.  She next competed at the Spanish Cup where she placed 36th.  At the Spanish National Championships Petisco finished 14th.

2018
2018 was a breakout year for Petisco.  Early in the season she competed at various Spanish League competitions and recorded the highest all-around score at the second one held in April.  In February she competed at the Mallorca Cup where she finished seventh in her division.  She competed at the Youth Olympic Qualifier where she placed 17th and qualified a spot for Spain.  Petisco next competed at the Spanish National Championships where she placed second in the all-around, behind Alba Asencio, as well as second on uneven bars and balance beam.  She next represented Spain at the European Championships.  During qualifications she helped Spain finish 11th as a team and individually placed 36th in the all-around.

In October Petisco represented Spain at the 2018 Youth Olympic Games.  She qualified to the all-around and was the third reserve for the vault final.  Her mixed multi-discipline team, which was named after gymnastics legend Simone Biles, won the gold medal.  In the all-around final she placed 11th.

Senior

2019
Petisco turned senior in 2019.  She made her senior international debut at the DTB Team Challenge where she helped Spain finish eighth as a team and individually she placed 14th in the all-around.  She competed at the European Championships but failed to qualify for any event finals.  Petisco competed at the Flanders International Team Challenge in Ghent, Belgium where she helped Spain finish 6th and individually she finished 13th.  At the Spanish National Championships Petisco finished 6th in the all-around but won silver on floor exercise behind.  In September Petisco competed at the Szombathely World Cup where she qualified to the uneven bars final.  During the final she finished in fifth place.  Petisco next competed at the 2nd Heerenveen Friendly where she helped Spain finish second behind the Netherlands and individually she placed 13th in the all-around.

At the 2019 World Championships, Petisco, alongside teammates Cintia Rodríguez, Roxana Popa, Ana Pérez, and Marina González, finished 12th as a team during qualifications.  Although they did not qualify to the team final, they qualified a team to the 2020 Olympic Games in Tokyo, giving Spain its first team berth at the Olympic Games since 2004.

2020 
Petisco competed at the American Cup, replacing teammate Roxana Popa.  She finished in 12th place.  Petisco was scheduled to compete at the Stuttgart World Cup taking place in March; however the event was later canceled due to the COVID-19 pandemic in Germany.

In December Petisco competed at the Spanish National Championships where she placed first in the all-around with a score of 52.100, ahead of Ana Pérez.

2021
In June 2021, Petisco was selected to the Spanish women's artistic gymnastics team for the postponed 2020 Summer Olympics alongside Laura Bechdejú, Marina González and Roxana Popa. The team finished 12th in qualifications and did not reach the final.

2022

Petisco started her season at the Cottbus World Cup, where she won the gold medal on floor exercise, and took the bronze on vault behind Tjaša Kysselef and Ofir Netzer.

In June, Petisco competed at the Mediterranean Games, where the Spanish team took the bronze medal behind Italy and France. Individually, Petisco finished fifth in the floor final. At the European Championships in Munich, Petisco helped Spain qualify to the team final, where they placed eighth. She also qualified to the balance beam final, finishing sixth with a score of 12.400.

Competitive history

References

External links 
 

2003 births
Living people
Spanish female artistic gymnasts
Gymnasts at the 2018 Summer Youth Olympics
Gymnasts from Barcelona
Youth Olympic gold medalists for Spain
Gymnasts at the 2020 Summer Olympics
Olympic gymnasts of Spain
Mediterranean Games bronze medalists for Spain
Mediterranean Games medalists in gymnastics
Gymnasts at the 2022 Mediterranean Games
21st-century Spanish women